Abraham Cheruiyot Tarbei is a Paralympian athlete from Kenya competing mainly in category T46 middle-distance events.

He competed in the 2008 Summer Paralympics in Beijing, China. There he won a gold medal in the men's 1500 metres - T46 event and a gold medal in the men's 5000 metres - T46 event.

External links
 

Paralympic athletes of Kenya
Athletes (track and field) at the 2008 Summer Paralympics
Paralympic gold medalists for Kenya
Kenyan male middle-distance runners
Kenyan male long-distance runners
Year of birth missing (living people)
Living people
World record holders in Paralympic athletics
Medalists at the 2008 Summer Paralympics
Medalists at the 2012 Summer Paralympics
Athletes (track and field) at the 2012 Summer Paralympics
Place of birth missing (living people)
Paralympic medalists in athletics (track and field)